Doug Vogt (born 1959) is a Canadian photojournalist and cameraman. He was born in Lethbridge, Alberta, Canada. He lived 25 years in Europe and presently lives in Los Angeles, United States.

Education
Doug Vogt studied Broadcast Journalism at Mount Royal College in Calgary Alberta Canada. He graduated from the college in 1980. Mount Royal College is now known as Mount Royal University.

Career
While on assignment in Iraq for ABC News with anchor Bob Woodruff, Vogt and Woodruff were both severely injured by a roadside bomb. Vogt was struck by shrapnel in the head and suffered other body injuries. He and Woodruff were wearing body armor and protective helmets at the time of the explosion.

Woodruff and Vogt received battlefield surgical treatment at the U.S. Air Force hospital south of Balad, Iraq and were evacuated to the United States Army Medical Command hospital at Landstuhl, Germany on Sunday, January 29. After arriving in the USA they were treated at the Intensive Care Unit at the NNMC in Bethesda, Maryland.

Vogt extensively covered war zones from 1986 until his injury in 2006. In 1992, covering the start of the war in Bosnia-Herzegovina, Doug Vogt was teamed up with ABC journalists Sam Donaldson, David Kaplan, Ben Sherwood and soundman Dave Calvert. After leaving the Sarajevo Airport in different vehicles producer David Kaplan was shot and killed by a sniper on the road nicknamed 'Sniper's Alley'.

Vogt has won six Emmy Awards and two DuPont Columbia Awards for his work. He was also awarded the USO Heart Of A Patriot award in 2007. Vogt has extensive experience with conflict journalism in Afghanistan, Iraq, Croatia, Bosnia and Somalia. Vogt has worked extensively with Peter Jennings, Diane Sawyer, Barbara Walters and Ted Koppel.

Personal
Vogt is married to Vivianne Maia E. "Vivian" Souza. They have three daughters, Naima, Savannah and Kira. They live in Aix-en-Provence, France.

References

External links 
 http://www.digitaljournalist.org/issue0502/dis_vogt.html Village of Lost Souls, by Doug Vogt] (February 2005)
 Iraq After Saddam: A Reporter's Notebook by Doug Vogt
 The Incredible Journey of Doug Vogt - interview by Mark Boogieman (November 14, 2015)

Canadian expatriate journalists in the United States
Canadian male journalists
Journalists from Alberta
1959 births
Living people
People from Lethbridge
Mount Royal University alumni
Iraq War casualties
20th-century Canadian journalists
21st-century Canadian journalists
Canadian photojournalists